Gerald Lewis may refer to:

 Gerald Lewis (basketball) (born 1971), retired American basketball player
 Gerald A. Lewis (born 1934), American attorney and Florida state comptroller